Ian Leslie Atkins (born 16 January 1957) is an English football manager, scout, and former player. Atkins amassed over 300 appearances for Shrewsbury Town, the club where he began his career. He also made appearances in the Football League for Sunderland, Everton, Ipswich Town and Birmingham City.

His first managerial role came as player-manager at Colchester United in 1990, narrowly missing out on promotion to the Football League. He also managed Cambridge United and Doncaster Rovers as player-manager, and found his most notable success at Northampton Town, leading the club to promotion via the play-offs in the Third Division in 1997 and finishing as play-off runners-up in the Second Division final the following season. In addition, he has been manager of Chester City, Carlisle United, Oxford United, Bristol Rovers and Torquay United.

Playing career

Atkins was born in the Sheldon district of Birmingham, where he attended Sheldon Heath School. He joined Shrewsbury Town in 1973 as an apprentice and signed a professional contract in 1975. Between 1975 and 1982, he made over 300 appearances in all competitions for Shrewsbury, helping the club to two promotions; from the Fourth Division to the Third Division and from the Third Division to the Second Division.

Atkins was signed by First Division team Sunderland in 1982 in a swap-deal and an £80,000 fee going to Shrewsbury. He made his debut for the club in a 3–1 win over European Cup holders Aston Villa. After two years and 77 league appearances at Roker Park, Atkins moved to Everton for £60,000, where he made just seven appearances, only playing a minimal role in securing the 1984–85 First Division title and European Cup Winners' Cup triumph, but receiving winner's medals for both triumphs.

Ipswich Town signed Atkins in September 1985 from Everton for a £100,000 fee, making his debut in a 1–0 away defeat to Leicester City on 28 September. He was captain of the club during his stint with Town, making 77 league appearances, although he could not help prevent Ipswich being relegated from the First to the Second Division. Atkins joined hometown team Birmingham City in March 1988, making 93 appearances and scoring six goals.

Managerial career

Atkins' managerial career began at Colchester United in 1990, signing as player-manager from Birmingham City. The onus was on Atkins to regain immediate promotion back to the Football League from the Conference, Colchester having been relegated the previous season. The club remained full-time in their first season outside the Football League since 1950, as the U's finished in second place, two points behind Barnet and missing out on promotion much to the dismay of the United chairman Jonathan Crisp. Atkins made 41 league appearances for the club and scored seven goals.

After leaving Colchester, Atkins returned to Birmingham City as player-coach, but made only eight appearances between 1991 and 1992. In December 1992, Atkins took the managers position at Cambridge United, but spent just six months with the club, unable to prevent them from relegation. He returned to Sunderland as assistant manager to Terry Butcher in 1993, before being sacked alongside Butcher. Atkins was approached to succeed Steve Beaglehole as manager of Doncaster Rovers in January 1994, making seven appearances as player-manager. He left in the summer of 1994 following disagreements with club owner Ken Richardson.

Atkins became manager of Northampton Town in January 1995 and was quick to turn around the fortunes of the fledgling club. He took Northampton to Wembley twice, in the 1997 Football League Third Division play-off Final, which Northampton won 1–0 against Swansea City to gain promotion to the Second Division, and the 1998 Football League Second Division play-off Final, which the team lost to Grimsby Town 1–0. The following season, Northampton were relegated back to the Third Division, and Atkins departed in October 1999.

His next challenge was at Chester City, joining as manager in January 2000 but by the end of May 2000, with Chester relegated from the Football League, he severed his ties with the club. In June 2000, Atkins was appointed manager at Carlisle United. Despite leading the Cumbrian side to safety from relegation in Division Three, Atkins was threatened with being sacked by owner Michael Knighton. Atkins left Carlisle to become assistant manager to Alan Cork at Cardiff City in July 2001, but was sacked in October. Soon after, he took over from Mark Wright as director of football at Oxford United, and was appointed manager in April 2002. 2001–02 was Oxford's first season in the bottom division of the Football League for over 30 years, and they finished a record low 21st place in the final table. Atkins rebuilt the team during the 2002 close season and the new-look squad looked capable of achieving a far higher position in the coming season. Oxford United occupied the automatic promotion and playoff places in Division Three for much of the 2002–03 season, but a slight dip in form during the final weeks of the season saw them finish eighth in the final table—one place short of the playoffs. A lively start to the 2003–04 season saw Oxford United leading the Division Three table at Christmas with just one defeat in over 20 fixtures. Atkins was suspended in March 2004 and then dismissed the following month for talking to Bristol Rovers about the possibility of taking over as manager, which he subsequently did.

Atkins was at Bristol Rovers for just over a year, and he was sacked after a disappointing start to the 2005–06 season. He returned to management in April 2006 when tasked with the seemingly impossible task of keeping Torquay United in the Football League, after joining the club as an advisor to John Cornforth the previous month. However, a run of four straight wins and a draw on the last day of the season lifted Torquay out of the relegation zone, and then Atkins was appointed manager for the following season. However, on 27 November 2006, Atkins was replaced as manager by Czech international star Luboš Kubík. Atkins was offered the role of Director of Football, but turned it down.

Since leaving Torquay, Atkins went on to work as a recruitment officer throughout Europe for Sunderland, including scout work for a number of other clubs, and joined BBC Radio Suffolk as a summariser for their coverage of Ipswich Town games for the 2009–10 season. He spent four years as head of recruitment at Everton before taking on the role of head of European recruitment at Aston Villa in 2016.

As of August 2019 he is currently a scout at Wolverhampton Wanderers

Managerial statistics

All statistics referenced by:

References

Honours 
Player

Shrewsbury Town
Welsh Cup: 1976–77, 1978–79
Division Three: 1978–79
Division Four promotion: 1974–75

Everton
European Cup Winners' Cup: 1984–85
Division One: 1984–85
FA Charity Shield: 1985

Birmingham City
Division Three promotion: 1991–92

Manager

Northampton Town
Third Division play-offs: 1996–97

Individual
League Two Manager of the Month: April 2006

External links

1957 births
Living people
People from Sheldon
Footballers from Birmingham, West Midlands
English footballers
Association football defenders
Association football midfielders
Association football utility players
Shrewsbury Town F.C. players
Sunderland A.F.C. players
Everton F.C. players
Ipswich Town F.C. players
Birmingham City F.C. players
Colchester United F.C. players
Cambridge United F.C. players
Doncaster Rovers F.C. players
English Football League players
National League (English football) players
English football managers
Colchester United F.C. managers
Cambridge United F.C. managers
Doncaster Rovers F.C. managers
Northampton Town F.C. managers
Chester City F.C. managers
Carlisle United F.C. managers
Oxford United F.C. managers
Bristol Rovers F.C. managers
Torquay United F.C. managers
National League (English football) managers
English Football League managers
Birmingham City F.C. non-playing staff
Cardiff City F.C. non-playing staff
Sunderland A.F.C. non-playing staff
Everton F.C. non-playing staff
Aston Villa F.C. non-playing staff